In inorganic chemistry, Fajans' rules, formulated by Kazimierz Fajans in 1923, are used to predict whether a chemical bond will be covalent or ionic, and depend on the charge on the cation and the relative sizes of the cation and anion. They can be summarized in the following table: 

{| class="wikitable"
!Ionic Character
!Covalent Character
|-
|Low positive charge
|High positive charge
|-
|Large cation
|Small cation
|-
|Small anion
|Large anion
|}

Thus sodium chloride (with a low positive charge (+1), a fairly large cation (~1 Å) and relatively small anion (0.2 Å) is ionic; but aluminium iodide (AlI3) (with a high positive charge (+3) and a large anion) is covalent.

Polarization will be increased by:
 high charge and small size of the cation
Ionic potential Å Z+/r+ (= polarizing power)
High charge and large size of the anion
The polarizability of an anion is related to the deformability of its electron cloud (i.e. its "softness")
An incomplete valence shell electron configuration
Noble gas configuration of the cation produces better shielding and less polarizing power
e.g. Hg2+ (r+ = 102 pm) is more polarizing than Ca2+ (r+ = 100 pm)

The "size" of the charge in an ionic bond depends on the number of electrons transferred. An aluminum atom, for example, with a +3 charge has a relatively large positive charge. That positive charge then exerts an attractive force on the electron cloud of the other ion, which has accepted the electrons from the aluminum (or other) positive ion.

Two contrasting examples can illustrate the variation in effects. In the case of aluminum iodide an ionic bond with much covalent character is present. In the AlI3 bonding, the aluminum gains a +3 charge. The large charge pulls on the electron cloud of the iodine. Now, if we consider the iodine atom, we see that it is relatively large and thus the outer shell electrons are relatively well shielded from the nuclear charge. In this case, the aluminum ion's charge will "tug" on the electron cloud of iodine, drawing it closer to itself. As the electron cloud of the iodine nears the aluminum atom, the negative charge of the electron cloud "cancels" out the positive charge of the aluminum cation. This produces an ionic bond with covalent character. A cation having inert gas like configuration has less polarizing power in comparison to cation having pseudo-inert gas like configuration.

The situation is different in the case of aluminum fluoride, AlF3. In this case, iodine is replaced by fluorine, a relatively small highly electronegative atom. The fluorine's electron cloud is less shielded from the nuclear charge and will thus be less polarizable. Thus, we get an ionic compound (metal bonded to a nonmetal) with a slight covalent character.

References

External links
 

Inorganic chemistry